William Stuart Michelson (born 1987) is an American engineer and member of the research faculty at the Georgia Tech Research Institute.  Michelson is known as a subject matter expert in Human Systems Engineering. He leads Human Factors and Ergonomics and Human Systems Integration (HSI) efforts for DoD customers specializing in tactical display design spanning command and control, training, unmanned vehicle ground control stations, Manned-unmanned teaming, and mission planning. He has expertise in digital human modeling/ergonomic/anthropometric analyses to assess cockpit accommodation and experience with wearable soldier systems and tactical equipment design.

Since 2000, Michelson has organized the American venue and annual Symposium on Dynamic Flight Behavior for Aerial Robotics for the International Aerial Robotics Competition (IARC).  The IARC, which seeks to advance the state of the art in fully autonomous aerial robotics, was created by his father, Robert C. Michelson, in 1991 and has two venues:  the American Venue and the Asia/Pacific Venue.

Michelson is a Lifetime Charter member of Trail Life USA, and currently serves as the Chairman of the National Board of Director’s for the organization.  He was involved in the launch of the Trail Life USA program in September 2013. Before joining the Board of Directors and later serving as its Vice Chairman, Michelson served as the State Leadership Chairman for Georgia, and as the coordinator for the Atlanta venue of the Trail Leader Training Conference to prepare leaders for Trail Life USA’s launch. He also pioneered a new adult training model and oversaw its deployment as the chairman of Trail Life USA’s inaugural adult leader training event at Camp Aiken in South Carolina. As a certified firearm’s instructor, he led a diverse national team of volunteers to develop the Trail Life USA shooting sports program.  As a youth, Michelson came out of the Boy Scouts of America after earning his Eagle Scout rank with 6 Palms and being bestowed the Vigil Honor in the Order of the Arrow.  As an adult, and prior to leaving the Boy Scouts of America, Michelson provided a monthly training program for adult volunteers and wrote custom training programs for youth that were adopted nationwide. He led several international Scouting initiatives, as well as organizing and planning Scouting events attended by thousands on a national scale. Other past volunteer roles within the organization included Scoutmaster, Varsity Coach, District Member at Large, Commissioner, and National Order of the Arrow staff.

From 2013 to 2014, Michelson served at an advisory capacity to the board of Reformation Hope in matters dealing with youth programs. He led efforts to foster new opportunities to help youth programs flourish in the country of Haiti and to meet orphaned children's needs, including an exchange program and a clothing acquisition fund. His most recent visit to the country was in 2016. In 2020, Michelson became a volunteer with the Evangelical Council for Abuse Prevention (ECAP), working on projects aimed at protecting children and other vulnerable populations from abuse.

Biography

Early life

Michelson was born in 1987 in Atlanta Georgia, the second son of Robert and Denise Michelson, and is related to Christian Michelsen, the first Prime Minister of Norway.

As a youth, Michelson was involved in outdoor activities, especially those involving camping and outdoor skills.  To this day, he remains a student of outdoor activities such as sailing, primitive survival skills, archery, and firearms proficiency.

Education
Michelson attended Cherokee Christian School during first through eighth grades. He attended Dominion Christian High School prior to enrolling at the Georgia Institute of Technology where he attained scientific degrees in Science, Technology, and Culture, as well as Human Computer Interaction (with honors).

Career
Michelson is a Research Affiliate at the Georgia Institute of Technology Institute for Robotics and Intelligent Machines (IRIM), as well as a member of the interdisciplinary faculty within the university's Masters in Human-Computer Interaction program. He has held an Associate Human Factors Professional status from the Board of Certification in Professional Ergonomics, is recognized as a graphic design professional by the International Academy of Computer Training, is certified to conduct ethical Human Subjects Research by Collaborative Institutional Training Initiative, and presently serves the Georgia Tech Research Institute as Senior Research Scientist.  He has published over 50 Journal papers, book chapters and reports.

In 2018 he became the Associate Head of the Georgia Tech Research Institute’s Human Systems Engineering Branch in the GTRI Electronic Systems Laboratory, and in 2022 became its Branch Head in the GTRI Applied Systems Laboratory.

Professional activities

Michelson is a full Member of the Human Factors and Ergonomics Society, Life member of the National Defense Industrial Association, and a member of the Association for Unmanned Vehicle Systems International.  In 2023, he was elected to the position of Deputy Chair of the Human Systems Division of the National Defense Industrial Association. He also serves as a Competition Director on behalf of RoboNation (formerly known as the AUVSI Foundation).

As a member of the Georgia Tech faculty, Michelson has taught several courses including modules in PMASE 6131: Georgia Tech Professional Education, 2017-2018, Applied Systems Engineering: Human Factors Engineering, Training, Survivability, Habitability, User Centered Design, and Test & Evaluation.  Michelson has also served as an instructor for the Georgia Tech Professional Education Short Courses Introduction to Human Systems Integration and Fundamentals of Modern Systems Engineering.

He is also organizer of the American Venue of the annual International Aerial Robotics Competition and annual Symposium on Dynamic Flight Behavior for Aerial Robotics

Professional programmatic interests

In 2007 Michelson began work at the Georgia Tech Research Institute.

Michelson has supported and led numerous notable programs within the Georgia Tech Research Institute leveraging his knowledge of soldier loadout and autonomous unmanned systems. Notably, he has designed graphical user interfaces, developed human-centered system requirements, led programs to quantify human performance, assessed anthropometric accommodations, and supported system test and evaluation for DoD stakeholders spanning the United States Navy, Air Force, Army, and Marine Corps. A frequent speaker across the Georgia Institute of Technology, international conferences, and government entities such as DARPA, Michelson is known for developing novel concepts for the command and control of unmanned systems, utilizing Model Based Systems Engineering to express man-machine teaming relationships, graphical user interface design for DoD systems, military mission planning concepts, and basic research on the touch zone sizes for military touchscreens in moving environments. Michelson has supported and organized a number of military working groups spanning topics such as electronic warfare, unmanned systems, and military end user engagement. Within the Human Factors Engineering context, Michelson is an advocate for “Mission-Driven Robotics”.

Professional honors and awards
Michelson received the Deputy Director’s Certificate for Service from the U.S. Army Soldier Battle Lab at Fort Benning.
He is also the recipient of the University System of Georgia Award for Exceptional Composition and the Georgia Secretary of State’s Commendation for Outstanding Citizenship.

Avocations
Michelson is certified in various fields including amateur radio (Technician Class Operator’s License, station KG4ZIR) and scuba diving.  He has been a PADI certified SCUBA diver since 2000, and has been a recreational diver in the Caribbean Sea and Atlantic Ocean.  He became a certified firearms instructor in 2012.

He is fluent in English, and has proficiency in German.

Presence in popular media and literature
Michelson has been often quoted in news programming with regard to the International Aerial Robotics Competition and the applications of the underlying technology to military and civilian spheres as well as Trail Life USA on radio and television. Michelson’s work on the command and control of heterogenous unmanned systems was featured by Drone360 Magazine in 2016, and he has been referenced in Backpacker Magazine. Michelson was also featured in a commercial produced by General Dynamics Mission Systems promoting advancement of the next generation of autonomous systems through collegiate student competition and has been featured repeatedly in promotional materials produced by the Association for Unmanned Vehicle Systems International

Representative select publications
“Concepts for Manned Unmanned Teaming Behaviors in Model Based Systems Engineering,”National Defense Industrial Association Ground Vehicle Systems Engineering and Technology Symposium, 2019
“Human Centered Teaming of Autonomous Battlefield Robotics,”National Defense Industrial Association Ground Vehicle Systems Engineering and Technology Symposium, 2018
“A Survey of the Human-Centered Approach to Micro Air Vehicles”. Chapter 90. Springer Handbook of Unmanned Aerial Vehicles, Springer‑Verlag Publishing Company, 2014 
“Human Centered Alerting Strategies Supporting Cross Platform Teams of Unmanned Vehicles”. AUVSI Xponential Unmanned Systems Conference, 2019
”A Model of Human Machine Interaction for Mission-Driven Robotics”. AUVSI Xponential Unmanned Systems Conference, 2020

See also
Georgia Tech Research Institute
International Aerial Robotics Competition
Trail Life USA

References

External links
Georgia Tech Research Institute
Trail Life USA
Board Member of Trail Life USA
Reformation Hope
Evangelical Council for Abuse Prevention

Living people
1987 births
21st-century American scientists
American people of Norwegian descent
Engineering educators
Georgia Tech faculty
Georgia Tech alumni
Georgia Tech Research Institute people
Amateur radio people
People from Atlanta